Roger Prahin (16 October 1923 – 25 February 2010) was a Swiss basketball player. He competed in the men's tournament at the 1952 Summer Olympics.

References

1923 births
2010 deaths
Swiss men's basketball players
Olympic basketball players of Switzerland
Basketball players at the 1952 Summer Olympics
Place of birth missing